The Sugar Man is an album by Stanley Turrentine. The recording is a compilation of four separate dates, each with different conductors, arrangers and other personnel. The album was recorded in 1971 after his successful debut, Sugar for the CTI label, but not released until 1975 after Turrentine had left for Fantasy Records.

Track listing
 "Pieces of Dreams" (Michel Legrand) - 6:50 (rec. 6/73)
 "The Stretch" (Stanley Turrentine) - 5:56 (rec. 3/71)
 "Vera Cruz" (Milton Nascimento) - 5:04 (rec. 4/71)
 "More (Theme from Mondo Cane)" (Riz Ortolani) - 6:11 (rec. 2/71)
 "Make Me Rainbows (from Fitzwilly)" (John Williams) - 6:03 (rec. 3/71)
 "Just As I Am" (Stanley Turrentine) - 5:25 (rec. 2/71)

Personnel
Stanley Turrentine - tenor sax (all tracks)
Harold Mabern - piano (track 1)
Eumir Deodato - electric piano (track 3)
Butch Cornell - organ (tracks 2,4,5 & 6)
Ron Carter - bass (all tracks)
Russell George - additional bass (track 3)
Idris Muhammad - drums (track 1)
Billy Cobham - drums (tracks 2,4,5 & 6)
Joao Palma - drums (track 3)
Airto Moreira - percussion (track 3)
Dom Um Romão - percussion (track 3)
Eric Gale - guitar (track 1)
Kenny Burrell - guitar (tracks 2 & 5)
Sivuca - acoustic guitar (track 3)
George Benson - guitar (tracks 4 & 6)
Rubens Bassini - conga (track 1)
Ray Barretto - conga (tracks 2,4,5 & 6)
Dave Friedman - vibraphone (tracks 4 & 6)
Blue Mitchell - trumpet (tracks 4 & 6)
Curtis Fuller - trombone (tracks 4 & 6)
Jerome Richardson - tenor sax, flute (tracks 4 & 6)

Flutes on track 3:
Hubert Laws, George Marge, Romeo Penque, Jerome Richardson

Production
Creed Taylor - Producer
Rudy Van Gelder - Engineer
Don Sebesky - Arranger (tracks 4 & 6)
Chico O'Farrill - Brass Arranger (tracks 4 & 6)
Bob James - Arranger & Conductor (track 1)
Eumir Deodato - Arranger & Conductor (track 3)
Alen MacWeeney - Cover Photography
Bob Ciano - Album Design

1975 albums
Stanley Turrentine albums
CTI Records albums
Albums arranged by Don Sebesky
Albums arranged by Eumir Deodato
Albums produced by Creed Taylor
Albums recorded at Van Gelder Studio